Songs from the Wasteland (A Tribute to the Mission) is a various artists compilation album released on February 17, 1998 by Re-Constriction Records. The album features industrial rock acts performing cover songs originally written by gothic rock band Mission UK. The idea originated from Tony Lestat, who approached Re-Constriction Records manager Chase to release the album.

Reception

Heather Phares of AllMusic said Songs from the Wasteland is arguably "fans of either the Mission UK or the bands paying tribute may find Songs From The Wasteland worthwhile." Aiding & Abetting gave the album a somewhat negative review, saying "unfortunately, most of the bands on this set (the ones picked by Tony Lestat, the main compilator) are fairly generic gothic (excuse me, darkwave) runthroughs" and "some of the more gothic versions sound nice enough, but they don't have anything new to say." Sonic Boom shared their critique and called the release "rather shallow and vapid" and "if it wasn't for the four Synthcore artists on this collection of The Mission covers by Gothic acts, this mediocre and monotonous release would fall flat on its face."

Track listing

Personnel
Adapted from the Songs from the Wasteland (A Tribute to the Mission) liner notes.
 Kaja Blackley –  cover art
 Chase – compiling, design
 Trevor Henthorn – mastering
 Tony Lestat – compiling
 Jeff Motch – design

Release history

References

External links 
 Songs from the Wasteland (A Tribute to the Mission) at Discogs (list of releases)

1998 compilation albums
Alternative rock compilation albums
Industrial metal compilation albums
Industrial rock compilation albums
Re-Constriction Records compilation albums
Tribute albums